Trikone is a non-profit support, social, and political organization for South Asian bisexual, lesbian, gay, and transgender people. It was founded in 1986 in the San Francisco Bay Area and is one of the oldest groups of its kind in the world. South Asians affiliated with Trikone are from or trace their ancestry to the following countries: Afghanistan, Bangladesh, Bhutan, India, Maldives, Burma, Nepal, Pakistan, Sri Lanka, and Tibet. Trikone published an eponymous magazine with an international base of subscribers several times a year.  The magazine was the oldest South Asian LGBT magazine in the U.S., and ran from 1986 to 2014.

Several metropolitan areas in North America aside from the San Francisco Bay Area also have organizations named "Trikone" (such as Trikone Northwest and Trikone Michigan), which have similar missions.

History and activities
The organization was co-founded in 1986 by Arvind Kumar and Suvir Das with the name "Trikon" and the first newsletter was published with that name in January 1986. (The name was later changed to "Trikone" due to a name conflict with an unrelated organization, "Tricon".) Following media coverage in both the United States and India, a group soon formed to continue the publication of the newsletter and to participate in local events such as the San Francisco Gay & Lesbian Pride Parade.

In 2000 and 2006, DesiQ, a South Asian queer conference of international scope was produced by the organization. In September 2001 QFilmistan, a film festival, was also produced.

About the name
The pink triangle is a historical symbol employed in gay liberation movements.

Women of Trikone
Women of Trikone is a sub group and also has separate a list-serve for queer women of South Asian descent from the Bay Area.

See also

List of LGBT organizations

References

External links
Official site
Trikone Northwest 
Women of Trikone Google Group
South Asian American organizations
International LGBT political advocacy groups
Organizations established in 1986
Non-profit organizations based in the San Francisco Bay Area
LGBT history in San Francisco
LGBT Asian-American culture
1986 in LGBT history
1986 establishments in the United States